Salenegg Castle is a castle in the municipality of Maienfeld of the Canton of Graubünden in Switzerland.  It is a Swiss heritage site of national significance.

Notable residents 

 Maria Gugelberg von Moos

See also
 List of castles in Switzerland

References

Cultural property of national significance in Graubünden
Castles in Graubünden
Maienfeld